Tajark (also Romanized as Ţajark) is a village in Korond Rural District, in the Central District of Boshruyeh County, South Khorasan Province, Iran. At the 2006 census, its population was 44, in 10 families.

References 

Populated places in Boshruyeh County